"Hypnotize" is a single by American rapper The Notorious B.I.G. featuring vocals by Pamela Long, released as the first single from his album Life After Death on March 4, 1997. The last song released before his death in a drive-by shooting a week later, it was the fifth song by a credited artist to hit number one posthumously, and the first since "(Just Like) Starting Over" by John Lennon in 1980. Rolling Stone ranked the song as number 30 on their list of the "100 Greatest Hip-Hop Songs of All Time".

Background
P. Diddy (known then as Puff Daddy) produced "Hypnotize" and sampled the Herb Alpert's 1979 hit "Rise" which was written by Andy Armer and Herb's nephew, Randy "Badazz" Alpert. Randy recalled, "I asked Puffy, in 1996 when he first called me concerning using 'Rise' for 'Hypnotize,' why he chose the 'Rise' groove. He told me that in the summer of 1979 when he was I think 10 years old the song was a huge hit everywhere in New York and 'Rise' along with Chic's 'Good Times' were 'the songs' that all the kids were dancing and roller skating to that summer. He had always remembered that summer and that song. When he first played the loop for Biggie, (he said that) Biggie smiled and hugged him."

Randy continued, "Over the years I was approached by Ice Cube, Eazy-E, Vanilla Ice, and maybe another 4–5 artists to use the song and I never said 'yes' until I heard a rough version of Biggie's recording produced by Sean 'Puffy' Combs, D-Dot, and Ron Lawrence. I was sent a cassette from Puffy and when I cranked it up I not only immediately loved it but my gut thought that this could be a number one record once again. The original 'Rise' record climbed the chart all summer and became number one around the end of October; Biggie's version was released and charted its first week at number two and went to number one the second week."

As for the chorus, or "hook", the melody and phrasing is interpolated from a lyrical section of Slick Rick's song "La Di Da Di", and it is also from these lyrics that the title "Hypnotize" is derived. Often misattributed to Lil Kim, Pamela Long from the group Total sang this part.

In 2013, when asked about the lyrics, "Escargot, my car go...", Lil' Cease of Junior M.A.F.I.A. stated, "Nah. See that's the shit that made B.I.G. dope. B.I.G. used to talk about all the cars but, nigga didn't even know how to drive. He wouldn't dare get in the driver seat."

Reception
The song was a hit on U.S. radio before being issued as a single. On its release, "Hypnotize" entered the Billboard Hot 100 at number two, right behind labelmate and co-writer and co-producer Sean "Puff Daddy" Combs ("Can't Nobody Hold Me Down"). When "Hypnotize" reached number one two weeks later, it made The Notorious B.I.G. the fifth artist in Hot 100 history to have a posthumous chart-topper (see List of Billboard Hot 100 chart achievements and milestones). It also gave back-to-back number-one hits to Combs' Bad Boy Records label. Nominated for Best Rap Solo Performance at the 1998 Grammy Awards, it lost to "Men in Black" by Will Smith. The single reached number 10 in the UK, B.I.G.'s first top 10 hit in that country. Kris Ex of Pitchfork wrote "Big was a master of flow, sounding unforced and unlabored over a bevy of pristine, hi-fidelity maximalist beats that seemed to always bow to his intent."

50 Cent told NME that the song was the one he would want played at his funeral: "I'd just want everyone to have as much of a party as possible."

Billboard and The Guardian both ranked the song number two on their lists of the greatest Notorious B.I.G. songs,  and Rolling Stone ranked the song number seven on their list of the 50 greatest Notorious B.I.G. songs.

Music video
The music video was released in March 1997. It was filmed in California in the US. Directed by Paul Hunter, the video starts off with the caption: Florida Keys 5:47 pm, with B.I.G. and Puff Daddy hanging out on a 60-foot Tempest yacht with some ladies when a bunch of helicopters disrupt their party and attempt to capture them. It then cuts to B.I.G. and Puff Daddy in an underground parking lot, where they spot a black Hummer and a group of men dressed in black riding motorcycles (possibly police). They attempt to get away from them by driving their convertible in reverse while in the streets. It cuts to a pool party that's set underwater, where swimsuit models can be seen shaking their bodies through the windows, and it ends with B.I.G. and Puff Daddy escaping the helicopters. Intercut throughout the video are scenes of B.I.G. and Puff Daddy behind a sepia background with some female dancers dressed in leather bikinis and B.I.G. dancing behind a black background while pieces of the chorus are captioned below.

Track listing
 "Hypnotize" (radio mix) – 4:06
 "Hypnotize" (instrumental) – 3:59
 "Hypnotize" (album version) – 5:32

Charts

Weekly charts

Year-end charts

Decade-end charts

Certifications

Release history

See also
 List of Billboard Hot 100 number-one singles of 1997
 List of number-one R&B singles of 1997 (U.S.)

Notes

References

The Notorious B.I.G. songs
1996 songs
1997 singles
Arista Records singles
Bad Boy Records singles
Billboard Hot 100 number-one singles
Music videos directed by Paul Hunter (director)
Songs written by Sean Combs
Songs written by the Notorious B.I.G.
Songs written by Deric Angelettie